City College of Calamba (CCC) is a public school in Laguna established in 2006. The institution was founded to provide education to the underprivileged. It is also subsidized by the city government and offers free tuition.

City College of Calamba has degree programs in the fields of accountancy, computer science, primary and secondary education.

Courses 
The CCC offers the following degree programs:
Bachelor of Science in Information Technology
Bachelor of Science in Computer Science
Bachelor in Secondary Education
Bachelor in Elementary Education 
Bachelor of Science in Accountancy
Bachelor of Science in Psychology
Bachelor of Science in Accounting Information System
Bachelor of Science in Early Childhood Education

References

36th in secondary education

Educational institutions established in 2006
Universities and colleges in Laguna (province)
Education in Calamba, Laguna
2006 establishments in the Philippines